This is the discography of British beat group Gerry and the Pacemakers.

Albums

Studio albums

Soundtrack albums

Live albums

Compilation albums

Video albums

EPs

Singles
In the United States, a different series of Gerry and the Pacemakers' singles was issued, as their Laurie Records label created more albums, and at least two singles, which were never issued in Britain. This was a standard practice at the time; it also happened with the Beatles and the Dave Clark Five.

Notes

References

Discographies of British artists
Rock music group discographies